IGL may refer to:
 Indole-3-glycerol-phosphate lyase, an enzyme
 The IATA code for Çiğli Air Base, a military airport
 Indoor Gridiron League, American football league